Harry David Brecheen (October 14, 1914 – January 17, 2004), nicknamed "The Cat", was an American left-handed pitcher in Major League Baseball who played most of his career for the St. Louis Cardinals. In the late 1940s he was among the team's stars, in 1946 becoming the first left-hander ever to win three games in a single World Series, and the only pitcher ever to win consecutive World Series games. He later led the National League in several categories in 1948.

His career World Series earned run average of 0.83 was a major league record from 1946 to 1976. From 1951 to 1971 he held the Cardinals franchise record for career strikeouts by a left-hander, and he also retired with the fourth-highest fielding percentage among pitchers (.983), then the top mark among left-handers.

Early life
Born in Broken Bow, Oklahoma, he was acquired by the Cardinals in 1938 after two minor league seasons, but did not get a chance to start for the team until 1943. He was nicknamed "The Cat" because of his ability to cover bunts.

Career 
He appeared in three innings in 1940. Exempted from military service during World War II with a 4-F classification due to a spinal malformation and a boyhood ankle injury, he pitched in the 1943 and 1944 World Series. In 1943, Brecheen pitched in 29 games, starting 13 of them. He went 9–6 with a 2.29 earned run average in 135 innings pitched. The next season, he went 16–5. He won game four of the 1944 World Series against the St. Louis Browns. He was key to the Cardinals' upset win over the Boston Red Sox in the 1946 World Series. He won three games during the series. He recorded his finest season in 1948, posting a win–loss record of 20–7 with 21 complete games and led the league in earned run average (2.24), strikeouts (149) and shutouts (7).

A two-time All-Star, his overall career record was 133 wins and 92 losses, with a 2.92 earned run average over 12 seasons. After breaking Bill Sherdel's club record for career strikeouts by a left-hander in 1951, he held the mark until Steve Carlton surpassed it in 1971. His 25 career shutouts remain the Cardinal record for left-handers. His career World Series ERA of 0.83 stood as the record (with at least 25 innings) until Jack Billingham broke it in 1976 with a mark of 0.36.

Playing his entire career for St. Louis teams, Brecheen ended his career in 1953 as a playing coach with the St. Louis Browns; it was that team's final season in the city before their move to Baltimore. He won his only start of the 1944 Series, which matched the city's two teams.

As a hitter, Brecheen was better than average, posting a .192 batting average (129-for-673) with 48 runs, 2 home runs, 44 RBI and 45 bases on balls.

Brecheen's screwball was ranked the eighth-best of all time by Bill James and Rob Neyer.

Later life 
Following his playing career, Brecheen remained with the Browns when they became the Baltimore Orioles. His playing career ended in 1954 when he hurt his arm trying to pick up a suitcase, but he remained with the organization as their pitching coach from 1954 to 1967. While coaching the Orioles pitchers for the next 14 years, the Orioles’ staff ranked in the top four in ERA.  He trained many young pitchers including Billy O'Dell, Jack Fisher, Jim Palmer, Dave McNally, Steve Barber, Chuck Estrada, Jerry Walker and Milt Pappas; He changed 36-year-old Hoyt Wilhelm into a starter in 1959. The knuckleballer led the league with a 2.19 era while winning 15 games and losing 11; With Brecheen's help, washed up Phillies legend Robin Roberts, made a comeback with the Orioles.  Brecheen was let go after the 1967 season after too many promising Orioles pitchers turned up with arm troubles during his long tenure.  He was voted into the Oklahoma Sports Hall of Fame in 1997. He died at age 89 in a nursing facility in Bethany, Oklahoma.

See also
 List of St. Louis Cardinals team records
 List of Major League Baseball annual ERA leaders
 List of Major League Baseball annual strikeout leaders

References

External links

 The Deadball Era
 
 Encyclopedia of Oklahoma History and Culture – Brecheen, Harry 

 
 

1914 births
2004 deaths
Baltimore Orioles coaches
Bartlesville Bucs players
Baseball players from Oklahoma
Columbus Red Birds players
East Central Tigers baseball players
Galveston Buccaneers players
Greenville Buckshots players
Houston Buffaloes players
Major League Baseball pitchers
Major League Baseball pitching coaches
National League All-Stars
National League ERA champions
National League strikeout champions
People from Ada, Oklahoma
People from Broken Bow, Oklahoma
Portsmouth Cubs players
St. Louis Browns coaches
St. Louis Browns players
St. Louis Cardinals players
Screwball pitchers